Vlax Romani is a dialect group of the Romani language. Vlax Romani varieties are spoken mainly in Southeastern Europe by the Romani people. Vlax Romani can also be referred to as an independent language or as one dialect of the Romani language. Vlax Romani is the second most widely spoken dialect subgroup of the Romani language worldwide, after Balkan Romani.

Name
The language's name Vlax Romani was coined by British scholar Bernard Gilliat-Smith in his 1915 study on Bulgarian Romani, in which he first divided Romani dialects into Vlach and non-Vlach. The Vlax Roma, a subgroup of the Romani people that speak the Vlax Romani language, originate from the former Roma slaves in the principalities of Moldavia and Wallachia (with the name "Vlax", which comes from "Vlach", coming from the latter), now Romania.
All Vlax Romani Groups share Vlachs Ancestry too 
The words Romani and Romania are false cognates, the former deriving from Romani rom – ultimately from Sanskrit word ḍoma/डोम, and the latter deriving from Romanian român – ultimately from Latin.

Classification 
Vlax Romani is classified in two groups: Vlax I, or Northern Vlax (including Kalderash and Lovari), and Vlax II, or Southern Vlax.

Elšík uses this classification and dialect examples (geographical information from Matras):

Writing systems

Vlax Romani is written using the Romani orthography, predominantly using the Latin alphabet with several additional characters. In the area of the former Soviet Union, however, it can also be written in the Cyrillic script.

References

Languages of Bosnia and Herzegovina
Languages of Romania
Languages of Slovenia
Romani in Albania
Romani in Bosnia and Herzegovina
Romani in Moldova
Romani in Romania
Romani in Slovenia
Dialects of Romani
Vlax